Stenocercus is a genus of South American lizards, commonly called whorltail iguanas, of the family Tropiduridae. This genus has 80 valid described species.

Geographic range
The greatest species richness is in Ecuador and Peru, but members of the genus Stenocercus are also found in Colombia, Brazil, Bolivia, Paraguay, Uruguay, and northern Argentina.

Species
The following 80 species are recognized, listed alphabetically by scientific name.
Stenocercus aculeatus (O’Shaughnessy, 1879)
Stenocercus albolineatus Teixeira, Prates, Nisa, Silva-Martins, Strüssmann & Rodrigues, 2015
Stenocercus amydrorhytus G. Köhler & Lehr, 2015
Stenocercus angel Torres-Carvajal, 2000
Stenocercus angulifer (F. Werner, 1901)
Stenocercus apurimacus Fritts, 1972 – Fritts's whorltail iguana
Stenocercus arndti Venegas, Echevarria & Alvarez, 2014
Stenocercus asenlignus Venegas, García-Ayachi, Chávez-Arribasplata & Garcia-Bravo, 2022
Stenocercus azureus (F. Müller, 1880)
Stenocercus boettgeri Boulenger, 1911 – Boettger's whorltail iguana
Stenocercus bolivarensis Castro & Ayala, 1982 – Bolivar whorltail iguana
Stenocercus cadlei Torres-Carvajal & Mafla-Endara, 2013
Stenocercus caducus (Cope, 1862)
Stenocercus canastra Ávila-Pires, Nogueira & Martins, 2019
Stenocercus carrioni Parker, 1934 – Parker's whorltail iguana
Stenocercus catherineae 
Stenocercus chinchaoensis Venegas, Duran & García-Burneo, 2013
Stenocercus chlorostictus Cadle, 1991
Stenocercus chota Torres-Carvajal, 2000
Stenocercus chrysopygus Boulenger, 1900 – golden whorltail iguana
Stenocercus crassicaudatus (Tschudi, 1845) – spiny whorltail iguana
Stenocercus cupreus Boulenger, 1885 – copper whorltail iguana
Stenocercus diploauris Venegas, Echevarria, García-Ayachi & Landauro, 2020
Stenocercus doellojuradoi (Freiberg, 1944)
Stenocercus dracopennatus 
Stenocercus dumerilii (Steindachner, 1867)
Stenocercus empetrus Fritts, 1972 – rock whorltail iguana
Stenocercus erythrogaster (Hallowell, 1856)
Stenocercus eunetopsis Cadle, 1991
Stenocercus festae (Peracca, 1897) – Peracca's whorltail iguana
Stenocercus fimbriatus Ávila-Pires, 1995 – western leaf lizard
Stenocercus flagracanthus 
Stenocercus formosus (Tschudi, 1845) 
Stenocercus frittsi Torres-Carvajal, 2005
Stenocercus guentheri (Boulenger, 1885) – Günther's whorltail iguana
Stenocercus haenschi (F. Werner, 1901) – Haensch's whorltail iguana
Stenocercus huancabambae Cadle, 1991
Stenocercus humeralis (Günther, 1859) – patterned whorltail iguana
Stenocercus ica 
Stenocercus imitator Cadle, 1991
Stenocercus iridescens (Günther, 1859)
Stenocercus ivitus Fritts, 1972 – ivy whorltail iguana
Stenocercus johaberfellneri G. Köhler & Lehr, 2015
Stenocercus lache Corredor, 1983
Stenocercus latebrosus Cadle, 1998
Stenocercus leybachi Venegas, García-Ayachi, Chavez-Arribasplata & Garcia-Bravo, 2022
Stenocercus limitaris Cadle, 1998
Stenocercus marmoratus (A.M.C. Duméril & Bibron, 1837)
Stenocercus melanopygus Boulenger, 1900 – dark whorltail iguana
Stenocercus modestus (Tschudi, 1845) – modest whorltail iguana
Stenocercus nigrobarbatus Venegas, Echevarria, García-Ayachi & Landauro, 2020
Stenocercus nigrocaudatus Venegas, García-Ayachi, Chávez-Arribasplata & Garcia-Bravo, 2022
Stenocercus nigromaculatus Noble, 1924 – black-spotted whorltail iguana
Stenocercus nubicola Fritts, 1972 – cloud whorltail iguana
Stenocercus ochoai Fritts, 1972 – Ochoa whorltail iguana
Stenocercus omari Venegas, Echevarría, García-Burneo & Koch, 2016
Stenocercus orientalis Fritts, 1972 – eastern whorltail iguana
Stenocercus ornatissimus (Girard, 1857) – lesser ornate whorltail iguana
Stenocercus ornatus (Gray, 1845) – Girard's whorltail iguana 
Stenocercus pectinatus (A.M.C. Duméril & Bibron, 1835)
Stenocercus percultus Cadle, 1991
Stenocercus philmayi 
Stenocercus praeornatus Fritts, 1972 – greater ornate whorltail iguana
Stenocercus prionotus Cadle, 2001
Stenocercus puyango Torres-Carvajal, 2005
Stenocercus qalaywasi Venegas, García-Ayachi, Chávez-Arribasplata & Garcia-Bravo, 2022
Stenocercus quinarius Nogueira & Rodrigues, 2006
Stenocercus rhodomelas (Boulenger, 1899) – red-black whorltail iguana
Stenocercus roseiventris D’Orbigny in A.M.C. Duméril & Bibron, 1837 – rose whorltail iguana
Stenocercus santander Torres-Carvajal, 2007
Stenocercus scapularis (Boulenger, 1901)
Stenocercus simonsii Boulenger, 1899 – Simons' whorltail iguana
Stenocercus sinesaccus Torres-Carvajal, 2005
Stenocercus squarrosus Nogueira & Rodrigues, 2006
Stenocercus stigmosus Cadle, 1998
Stenocercus torquatus Boulenger, 1885
Stenocercus trachycephalus (A.H.A. Duméril, 1851) – Duméril's whorltail iguana
Stenocercus tricristatus (A.H.A. Duméril, 1851)
Stenocercus variabilis Boulenger, 1901 – variable whorltail iguana
Stenocercus varius Boulenger, 1885 – keeled whorltail iguana

Nota bene: A binomial authority in parentheses indicates that the species was originally described in a genus other than Stenocercus.

References

Further reading
Boulenger GA (1885). Catalogue of the Lizards in the British Museum (Natural History). Second Edition. Volume II. Iguanidae, ... London: Trustees of the British Museum (Natural History). (Taylor and Francis, printers). xiii + 497 pp. + Plates I-XXIV. (Genus Stenocercus, p. 131).
Cadle JE (1991). "Systematics of lizards of the genus Stenocercus (Iguania: Tropiduridae) from northern Peru. New Species and comments on relationships and distribution patterns". Proceedings of the Academy of Natural Sciences of Philadelphia 143: 1-96. [For erratum see Cadle JE (1993). Proc. Acad. Nat. Sci. Philadelphia 144: 345].
Duméril AMC, Bibron G (1837). Erpétologie générale ou histoire naturelle complète des reptiles. Tome quatrième [Volume 4]. Paris: Roret. ii + 571 pp. (Stenocercus, new genus, pp. 349–350). (in French).
Goin CJ, Goin OB, Zug GR (1978). Introduction to Herpetology, Third Edition. San Francisco: W.H. Freeman. xi + 378 pp. . (Genus Stenocercus, p. 291).

Gallery

Stenocercus
Lizard genera
Taxa named by André Marie Constant Duméril
Taxa named by Gabriel Bibron
Taxonomy articles created by Polbot